Axson is a census-designated place in Atkinson County, Georgia, United States. Axson has a post office with ZIP code 31624. Per the 2020 Census, the population was 360.

History
An early variant name was "McDonald's Mill". A post office called Axson has been in operation since 1916. The latter name is after First Lady Ellen Axson Wilson.

Demographics

2020 census

Note: the US Census treats Hispanic/Latino as an ethnic category. This table excludes Latinos from the racial categories and assigns them to a separate category. Hispanics/Latinos can be of any race.

References

Unincorporated communities in Atkinson County, Georgia
Census-designated places in Atkinson County, Georgia